Big Brother Sverige 2021 is the ninth and final season of the Swedish Big Brother.

The ninth season was announced by TV4 on 12 October 2020. It was also announced the season would start on 15 February 2021. This season was planned to run for 99 days. The prize for the winner is 1,000,000 kr.

On 27 January 2021, it was announced that Malin Stenbäck will return to present the live shows with Arantxa Alvarez. Also, the host duo will be accompanied by comedian Kirsty Armstrong; she would talk more about the events from inside the house. YouTuber Filip Dikmen will take part in the studio shows and give judgments and analyses about the housemates' behavior.

The premiere was held on Monday, 15 February 2021, on Sjuan. Weekly live shows are being shown on Mondays. New studio shows are broadcast from Tuesday to Thursday and classic Big Brother daily shows are shown from Friday to Sunday. There were live streams with multiple camera angles on C More, and there were the best clips continuously published on TV4 Play. Because viewers wanted more content of the house, a show named Bara Huset began airing on Thursday, 18 February 2021, as a test run. This show summarizes the best events from the past day.

For this season, the logo of the show remains the same as last season. The Big Brother house was slightly redecorated, with the confession room remaining the same.

The format of this season remains the same as the previous season. Housemates are allowed to talk about nominations if they want after that week's nominees were reported to the house.

On Thursday, 18 March 2021, one of the hosts, Malin Stenbäck, revealed during the studio show that this was her last show for this season. The reason is that she is also the host of Bachelor Sverige and Bachelorette Sverige, and the recording of these two shows will start soon and the schedule will collide with Big Brother. Arantxa Alvarez continued to host the show as usual.

Housemates
On Day 1, during the launch show, 10 housemates entered the Big Brother house. For the first time in Big Brother Sverige history, 2 additional housemates Jesper and Pontus did not enter the house. Instead, they had to live in a motorhome for a period of time. On Day 2 evening, after housemates completed the squirrel wheel task, Jesper and Pontus moved into the house as the award.

On the morning of Day 11, the first "Joker" of the season, Tanja, entered the house as a new housemate. On Day 13, the second "Joker", Adrian, entered the house.

On Day 22, a new audition started to search for new housemates.

On Day 26, Madelene entered the house. On Day 32, Alexander entered the house. On Day 39, Jaqueline entered the house. On Day 41, Dennis entered the house.

On Day 43, three returning players from the last season entered the house. They were Julia, Mergim and Victoria.

Game history & nominations table

Qualifying Game Phase (Week 1 - Week 8)

Notes
Week 1
: Housemates were divided into two teams.  Team Purple: Jesper, Luis, Pedram, Pontus, Simon, and Therese.  Team Turquoise: Emelie, Joel, Judith, Katti, Nardos, and Stephanie. Team Purple won the weekly team competition and Team Turquoise lost, therefore, they were nominated.
: Judith won the immunity challenge, therefore, she was safe for the week.
: Joel was saved by the block-chain vote. He was the only housemate who was not blocked for immunity and safe for this week.
: Because Emelie, Katti, Nardos and Stephanie were nominated, they had to make their speech to the viewers. The housemates would decide one of them would win the speech and receive immunity. The housemates chose Stephanie.
: Unbeknown to the housemates, no one would be evicted on the first weekly final live show. However, the housemate with the least votes would have to start next week with a disadvantage. On the live show, it was revealed that Nardos received the least votes and she had to wear an electric shot suit.

Week 2
: This week was the TV theme week. For the weekly team competition, housemates were divided into four teams according to their gender.  Male gladiators: Jesper, Joel, and Pedram.  Male challengers: Luis, Pontus, and Simon.  Female gladiators: Emelie, Katti, and Stephanie.  Female challengers: Judith, Nardos, and Therese. In the end, the challengers won this week's team competition and the gladiators lost, therefore, the gladiators had to Nominated.
: Emelie won the immunity challenge, therefore, she was safe for the week.
: Tanja and the safe housemates each had to give a white camel to the housemate who Nominated, depending on who they wanted to stay. The housemate who has the most camels will be saved. Stephanie received the most camels and therefore was safe for the week.
: Nardos and Pedram received a warning from Big Brother for talking strategy. As a consequence, Pedram has no chance of being saved before Monday's weekly final, and Nardos is not allowed to participate in Friday's competition, where one of the awards is immunity from an upcoming nomination.
: Therese won immunity during Friday's "Färgfemman" in Big Brother Bingo. She handed out the immunity to Joel, therefore, Joel was saved.

Week 3
: At the end of the second weekly final live show, it was revealed that Nardos and Judith will compete head-to-head and become parents of children in a babysitting immunity challenge.  Judith won and therefore was immune for the week.
: This week was the Pair Week. The housemates were split into pairs of two. The pairs are:  Adrian and Emelie,  Luis and Therese,  Katti and Pedram,  Nardos and Simon,  Pontus and Stephanie, and  Joel and Tanja.
: On Day 17, Adrian and Emelie won the first immunity competition. On Day 18, Pontus and Stephanie won the second immunity competition.
:  On Day 18, Katti received a warning from Big Brother due to her use of an offensive word. As a punishment, she was automatically nominated for eviction and cannot be saved before Monday's weekly final.
: On Day 19, Adrian won Friday's competition. He was asked to choose who to save among Joel & Tanja, Luis & Therese, Nardos & Simon, or Pedram. He chose to save Pedram.
: On Day 19, the viewers voted for their favorite pair. The pair that received the most votes will be saved from hanging loose. The voting closed on the morning of Day 20. Joel & Tanja received the most votes and therefore were saved.

Week 4
: This week was the Farmen (The Farm) week. The housemates live poorly and were divided into two teams. Joel Kosari was the one who has split the team by the advantage he won on package competition last Sunday (Day 21). The teams are:  Team 1 (Adrian, Katti, Simon, Stephanie, Tanja and Therese) and  Team 2 (Emelie, Joel, Judith, Nardos, Pedram and Pontus).
: On Day 23, the teams competed against each other for the first time and the winners got a little more comfortable and had to move to Farmen Hedemora in the living room. The losing team had to move to Farmen Skillingaryd in the pool house. In there, they had to build their own beds made of hay and led to the cup overflow for Emelie Svensson. There were six different competitions for two housemates from each team and the teams must agree on the order in which they will compete; each housemate competes only once. Each win will earn one point for the winning team. This competition is not about immunity but to determine which team goes to Farmen Hedemora or Farmen Skillingaryd. In the end,  Team 1 got the most number of winning points (4), therefore, they went to Farmen Hedemora.  Team 2 got the least number of winning points (2), therefore, they went to Farmen Skillingaryd.
: For the team competition on Day 24, there were a total of three different competitions with two housemates from each team at a time in each competition. Team Hedemora has the privilege of choosing which two from both teams to compete in the first branch. In this round of competition, teams turned into  Team Pink (Team 1) and  Team Green (Team 2). In the end, with 2 to 1 winning, Team Green won, which means that Emelie, Joel, Judith, Nardos, Pedram, and Pontus were safe for the week.
: For the duel on Day 25, the housemates had to vote for those who are Nominated in Farm Hedemora who will compete in a duel. The two housemates with the most votes will be chosen as fighters. The one who wins the duel becomes the Big Farmer and the one who loses will leave immediately. After the voting, it was revealed that Katti received the most votes and became the fighter. However, because there was a tie between Adrian and Simon, the public would decide who will be the second fighter. The public chose Adrian.  In the end, Adrian won the duel, so he became the Big Farmer and received immunity.  Katti had to leave the house immediately, however, she was moved to the croft inside the mission room.
: On Day 26, a bullfighting competition took place in the house, Pontus was the winner of immunity, but he was already safe for this week. He chose to give this immunity to another housemate, Simon.
: On Day 27, it was revealed that the viewers chose to save Tanja.

Week 5
: This week was Hockey Week. The housemates was divided into teams and met each other in hockey matches.  Pink team: Pontus, Simon and Tanja,  Purple: Adrian, Katti and Nardos,  Yellow: Emelie, Pedram and Stephanie,  Green: Joel, Judith and Madelene. On Day 30, the Purple team (Adrian, Katti and Nardos) won the first tournament. Therefore, they were saved.
: On Day 31, the Green team (Joel, Judith and Madelene) won the second tournament. Therefore, they were saved.
: On Day 32, for today's "Air Hockey" immunity competition, only three housemates were able to compete in the final match. Housemates who were Hanging Loose would compete with each other on qualifying matches before the final match. Emelie, Pedram, and Tanja advanced to the final match. In the end, Pedram won the final match, therefore, he was saved.
: On Day 33, Adrian won today's competition and he had to save one Hanging Loose housemate. He chose Emelie.
: Because Pontus, Simon, Stephanie, and Tanja were nominated, they had to make their speech to the viewers. The housemates would decide who among them would win the speech and receive immunity. The housemates chose Simon.

Week 6
: This week was School Week. All housemates started as students and competed against each other during the week. On the afternoon of Day 37, housemates have a knowledge test with the master knowledge bird. The one who got the most right answers on the test would be immune and also became the teacher for the rest of the week. In the end, Simon won, therefore, he became the teacher and received immunity.
: Teacher Simon's test took place on the afternoon of Day 37. Pedram won, therefore, he became a teacher alongside Simon and also received immunity.
: Teacher Pedram's test took place on the morning of Day 38. Tanja won, therefore, she became a teacher and also received immunity.
: Teacher Tanja's test took place on the afternoon of Day 38. In the end, Tanja won, therefore, she became a teacher and also received immunity.
: On Day 38, Adrian was automatically nominated for eviction by Big Brother due to his offensive word. He cannot be saved before Monday's weekly final.
: Alexander, Judith and Jaqueline were both saved on teachers' tests respectively and they became teachers.
: On Day 40, Joel was saved on Filip Dikmen's test.

Week 7
: This week was the Challenger Week. The housemates were split into teams by Mergim after the viewers voted for him as a team divider. Teams had to compete for immunity in different challenges. The teams are:  Team Mergim: Mergim, Adrian, Pedram and Tanja.  Team Victoria: Victoria, Alexander and Emelie.  Team Julia: Julia, Stephanie and Dennis.  Team Nardos: Nardos, Madelene and Judith.  Team Simon: Simon, Jaqueline and Joel. After the competition on Day 44, Team Julia won, and they were safe for the week.
: For the competition on Day 45, only one place was left for Mergim and Victoria to compete for immunity. For the one who does not become immune, the viewers must decide if that person should remain in the house. Team Mergim won the competition and they were safe for the week. The public would decide Victoria's fate.
: On Day 46, Team Simon won the competition and they were safe for the week.
:  In the morning of Day 47, a voting duel took place. The saved housemates should choose one of nominated housemates who would face Victoria in a voting duel. After the housemates voted in the confession room, it was revealed that the housemates chose Alexander. The viewers would have to vote for who they wanted to be allowed to stay in the house; one of them would be evicted on Sunday.
: The saved housemates compete for immunity. The winner, Mergim, won the competition and he had to save one nominated housemate. He chose to save Nardos.
: Victoria was ejected due to repeated violations of the rules and breaches of integrity. The voting duel between Victoria and Alexander has been cancelled. Instead, it is up to the viewers to decide whether Alexander should continue to Nominated or not. It was revealed that the public chose Alexander to remain Nominated.

Week 8
: This week was the Military week. The housemates were split into  Generals and  Recruits. After Alexander's eviction, the public voted for two housemates to become Generals; they chose Emelie and Nardos. The Generals would be immune for the week. The rest of the housemates were Recruits and were split into teams:  Team Pink - Julia, Jaqueline, Simon, and Tanja;  Team Yellow - Adrian, Judith, Mergim, and Stephanie; and  Team Turquoise - Dennis, Madelene, Joel, and Pedram.
: Team Turquoise won the team challenge on the afternoon of Day 51. Dennis, Madelene, Joel, and Pedram were promoted to Commanders and were safe for the week. However, the viewers voted for Pedram as the housemate who was not up to standard and tough enough, therefore, he was demoted to Recruit but is still safe for the week.
: For the team competition on Day 52, the Recruits were split into three teams:  Team Pink - Stephanie & Julia;  Team Yellow - Judith & Simon; and  Team Green - Jacki & Adrian. Team Green won and were safe for the week.
: On Day 53, Mergim passed the IQ test, therefore, she was saved for the week.
: On Day 55, Jaqueline received the most votes from the public; she was demoted and was once again being recruited.
: On Day 55, Julia left the house voluntarily for personal reasons.

Final Game Phase (Week 9 - Week 14)

Notes
Week 9
: This week is the Time Machine Week. The housemates will move to different ages during the week. During the week, housemates had to compete for different benefits.
: On Day 58, Emelie and Dennis won the ice melting competition and won an extra nomination jointly. They nominated Tanja (in italic).
: Mergim was blocked from competing in the immunity competition by the choice of Pedram, Nardos, Simon, and Tanja. Pedram won the immunity competition and he was immune from nomination this week.

Week 10
: On Day 65, Adrian won the competition by collecting the most number of balloons and he received an extra nomination point in the nomination. Nardos collected the least number of balloons and she received one nomination point for herself.
: On Day 66, each housemate had to block one other housemate from competing in the immunity competition. Adrian blocked Simon, Madelene blocked Dennis, Pedram blocked Joel, Tanja blocked Nardos, Nardos blocked Dennis, Simon blocked Adrian, Dennis blocked Simon, Emelie blocked Adrian, Mergim blocked Dennis, Judith blocked Dennis, and Joel blocked Adrian. Dennis received the most votes, therefore, he was not able to compete in the immunity competition. Adrian won the immunity competition and he was immune from nomination this week.
: Madelene, Nardos, Pedram, and Simon received the same number of nomination points. On Day 68, they were required to vote again. They were called one by one to the confession room to vote for the housemate who they wanted to leave; the person who received the most votes would be the fourth nominee. Because Madelene and Pedram both received the same number of votes, the fourth nominee would be decided by the viewers instead. The housemate who received the least save votes would be nominated. Madelene received more save votes than Pedram, therefore, Pedram became the fourth nominee, alongside Dennis, Emelie, and Mergim.

Week 11
: The housemates were divided into two groups: Big Brothers and Little Brothers. The Little Brothers live inside Little BB, which is inside the task room. The Big Brothers decide the house rules and competitions, and their job is to keep track of the Little Brothers.  Big Brothers: Simon, Madelene, Tanja, and Pedram.  Little Brothers: Nardos, Adrian, Dennis, Joel, Judith, and Emelie. Adrian and Simon won one extra nomination each in this week's nomination (in italic).
: On Day 73, Joel chose to leave the house for personal reasons.
: On Day 73, the public has decided that only the Little Brothers were available to be nominated, therefore, the Big Brothers received immunity this week.
: Simon was demoted to Little Brother because of his behavior on the night of Day 72.
: Adrian and Pedram received the same number of points during the nomination. Therefore, three Little Brothers (Judith, Madelene, and Nardos) need to make a tough decision on who between the two would be nominated.

Week 12
: Nardos won one extra nomination in this week's nomination (in italic).
: Adrian and Nardos won the immunity competition, but since Adrian was blocked from winning immunity earlier in the day, only Nardos is safe.

Week 13
: After Adrian's eviction, the housemates took part in a vote for a housemate to receive a one nomination point disadvantage. Since Madelene, Nardos, and Pedram all received the same number of votes, a second vote had to be held. Madelene received the most votes, therefore, she automatically received one nomination point.

Week 14
: For the final week, there was an eviction before the finale on Days 93, 94, and 97. All housemates were nominated for eviction. In each of those evictions, the housemate who received the least votes would be evicted.
: The public voted for their winner.

References

External links
Official website on TV4
Big Brother Sverige on TV4 Play
Big Brother Sverige on C More

9
2021 Swedish television seasons
2021 in Swedish television